The Esslingen railbus (German: Esslinger Triebwagen) is a diesel railbus first delivered in 1951 for private railways (Nichtbundeseigene Eisenbahn) in Germany.

History 
The Esslingen railbus, sometimes shortened in German to Esslinger, had been developed during the 1950s by the  Maschinenfabrik Esslingen for small branch lines and private railways. Fifty examples were built in three variants: power coaches (Triebwagen) or VT, trailer coaches (Beiwagen) or VB and driving coaches (Steuerwagen) or VS.

Of the first series, 25 VT, 6 VB and 4 VS were delivered into service, of the second series (from 1959) 6 VT, 4 VB and 5 VS.

Gallery

Sources 
 Thomas Estler: Esslinger Triebwagen. Transpress Verlag, Stuttgart 2002,

External links 
 Verbleib des VT 103 bei der Chiemgauer Lokalbahn (Bad Endorf–Obing)
 historisches zur Regentalbahn - Heimat der Esslinger
 Esslinger Triebwagen bei der Regentalbahn

Diesel multiple units of Germany
German railbuses